Risto Nuuros (born 26 December 1950) is a Finnish orienteering competitor, individual silver medalist at the 1978 World Orienteering Championships in Kongsberg.

He received silver medals in the relay event in 1974 and 1979, and a bronze medal in 1978.

See also
 Finnish orienteers
 List of orienteers
 List of orienteering events

References

1950 births
Living people
Finnish orienteers
Male orienteers
Foot orienteers
World Orienteering Championships medalists